Acèrbo or Acerbo is an Italian surname and may refer to:

 Acerbo Morena (died 1167), Italian chronicler
 Giacomo Acerbo, Italian economist and Fascist politician, author of the Acerbo Law
 Maurizio Acerbo (born 1965), Italian politician and former Secretary of the Communist Refoundation Party
 Sandro Acerbo (born 1955), Italian voice actor

Other
 Coppa Acerbo, an Italian automobile race
 Acerbo Law, an Italian electoral law

See also 
 
 Acerbi, a related surname